Fremont Park sits centrally in Elizabeth, Adelaide, South Australia, which is located within the City of Playford.

Elizabeth has large areas of open space, with the most prominent being Fremont Park, on Main North Road. It was originally known as Town Park.

The former City of Elizabeth was the sister city of Fremont, California, which Fremont Park was named after. The Fremont Park is a lush green space where you can relax, exercise and enjoy with your family. It is filled with all the recreational amenities, such as an all-ability play equipment, a gazebo, an exercise gym and two playgrounds. It also includes a large lake which has been beautified with fountains and waterfalls.

See also
List of Adelaide parks and gardens

References

Parks in Adelaide